Totton railway station serves the town of Totton, Hampshire, England and is on the South West Main Line. It is managed by South Western Railway who also operate the only services to stop at the station.

History
The station was constructed by the London and South Western Railway and opened in 1859 as Eling Junction, after the name of the junction with the Eling Tramway branch located adjacent to the station. It was renamed in later the same year as Totton after the growing community surrounding the station.

The station passed into the ownership of the Southern Railway following the passing of the Railways Act 1921 and the subsequent grouping. It became the junction station for the Fawley Branch Line which opened in 1925. Following nationalisation of the railways in 1948, the station became part of British Railways' Southern region, and is now owned by Network Rail, and operated by South Western Railway.

Facilities
The station has few facilities, with a ticket office only open during weekday morning peak hours. Access to the station is available from both the north and south sides of the station with a footbridge available to cross the track. The station entrances and the footbridge are located at the extreme east end of the platforms; there are no ticket gates present on the station meaning the footbridge is accessible to any pedestrian wishing to cross the line.

The station consists of two platforms:

 Platform 1, located on the north side of the station, for trains heading east towards Southampton and London. Geographically the next station is Redbridge. However, there are no direct trains from Totton to Redbridge so the next station for trains departing from Totton is Southampton Central.
 Platform 2, located on the south side of the station, for trains heading west towards Brockenhurst, Bournemouth and Weymouth, with the next station being Ashurst (New Forest).

The station has a waiting room, located within the station building on Platform 1, but is only available for use during the weekday morning peak time when the station staff are available. In addition a covered awning provides shelter on Platform 1 and a small shelter has been installed on Platform 2. There are cycle shelters located on Platform 1.

Platform 2 is inaccessible to wheelchair users due to steps being present both on the footbridge and to reach the platform from the south entrance to the station. This has in the past resulted in passengers travelling to Southampton Central, where they can change trains.

Services

Rail
On Sundays, the off-peak timetable is used.

Previously, the station was the terminus of a local service that ran from Totton to Romsey via a 'horseshoe' shaped route through Southampton Central and Chandler's Ford.

The now freight-only Fawley Branch Line leaves the main line a short distance west of the station. The line has been identified as a priority for reopening to passenger use by Campaign for Better Transport.

Bus
The station is also served by 7 bus services that stop on Commercial Road, to the north of the station. These services are:

 First Hants and Dorset route 1 to Calmore and to Southampton in the opposite direction.
Bluestar route 6 to Lyndhurst and Lymington and to Southampton in the opposite direction.
Bluestar route 8 to Marchwood and Hythe and to Southampton in the opposite direction.
Bluestar route 11 to West Totton and to Southampton in the opposite direction.
Bluestar route 12 to Calmore and to Southampton in the opposite direction.
Salisbury Reds route X7 to Salisbury and to Southampton in the opposite direction.
Salisbury Reds route X7R to Salisbury and to Southampton in the opposite direction.

Additional bus services stop in the Town centre nearby.

Location
Totton railway station is located approximately a third of a mile away from the town centre of Totton resulting in an location isolated and overlooked from the rest of the town. In the summer of 2015, improvements were made across the town and at the station to link the station up with the rest of the town by providing better quality lighting and roads and directional signage towards the station in the town centre.

See also
Totton and Eling

References

External links
 Totton station facilities at National Rail.
 Totton station facilities at South Western Railway.

Railway stations in Hampshire
DfT Category E stations
Railway stations in Great Britain opened in 1859
Former London and South Western Railway stations
Railway stations served by South Western Railway